Dennis Novikov (born 6 November 1993 in Moscow, Russia) is an American professional tennis player born in Russia.

He  won both the singles and doubles titles at the USTA Boys 18s National Championships in Kalamazoo, Michigan in 2012. As a result, he was awarded wild cards into the main draw of the US Open in both singles and doubles. He did not join the UCLA tennis team until March 2012, first competing on March 27.

Tennis career
Novikov won his first main-draw match at the US Open in 2012, defeating world no. 86 Jerzy Janowicz of Poland in four sets. In doubles, he teamed with Michael Redlicki. In the first round, they defeated compatriots Bobby Reynolds and Michael Russell in three sets, with a tie-break in the third set.

In 2015, he qualified for the main draw in Indian Wells. That year, Novikov also captured his first two titles on the ATP Challenger Tour in back-to-back weeks. He won the inaugural Cary Challenger the week of September 14 followed by the Columbus Challenger the week of September 21. Novikov defeated Ryan Harrison in both finals.

During the 2016 season, Novikov made his debut at Wimbledon by qualifying for the main draw. He advanced to the second round after defeating fellow qualifier Luke Saville in an opening round match.

Challenger and Futures finals

Singles: 12 (9–3)

Doubles: 27 (15–12)

Performance timeline

Singles

References

External links
 
 
 UCLA Bruins player profile

American male tennis players
1993 births
Living people
Tennis players from Moscow
American people of Russian descent
Sportspeople from San Jose, California
UCLA Bruins men's tennis players
Tennis players at the 2015 Pan American Games
Pan American Games bronze medalists for the United States
Pan American Games medalists in tennis
Medalists at the 2015 Pan American Games